The 1937–38 1re série season was the 22nd season of the 1re série, the top level of ice hockey in France. Français Volants won their second championship.

Final ranking
 1st place: Français Volants
 2nd place: Chamonix Hockey Club
 3rd place: Diables de France

External links
List of French champions on hockeyarchives.info

Fra
1937–38 in French ice hockey
Ligue Magnus seasons